Lionel Neykov is a French songwriter and singer.

He became very popular in Spain during Christmas 2008 after his song Freeze my senses was selected for the annual advertising campaign of the Spanish Christmas Lottery.

Biography
Born to a French mother and a Bulgarian father in Paris, he started playing the guitar when he was 21 years old. He soon started to write and record his own songs.
At the age of 24, he moved to New York, where he currently lives.
In summer 2007 he started working on his first album; Songs of Want and Loss.
After releasing his songs on YouTube and MySpace, his song Freeze my senses was selected by the Advertising agency "Ricardo Pérez Asociados" for the television advertisement they were preparing for the Spanish Christmas Lottery campaign for 2008. When "Ricardo Pérez Asociados" was selected by the Spanish Lottery to produce the commercials, he was contacted again and got a US$20,000 deal for the use of his song on the advertisement, twice what he was offered initially.

References

1979 births
Living people
Musicians from Paris
French emigrants to the United States
American singer-songwriters
French people of Bulgarian descent
21st-century American singers